René Goscinny (14 August 1926 – 5 November 1977) was a French comic editor and writer, who created the Astérix comic book series with illustrator Albert Uderzo. He was raised primarily in Buenos Aires, Argentina, where he attended French schools, as well as lived in the United States for a short period of time. There he met Belgian cartoonist Morris. After his return to France, they collaborated for more than 20 years on the comic series Lucky Luke (in what was considered the series' golden age).

He wrote Iznogoud with Jean Tabary. Goscinny also wrote a series of children's books known as Le Petit Nicolas (Little Nicolas) illustrated by Jean-Jacques Sempé.

Early life
Goscinny was born in Paris in 1926, to Jewish immigrants from Poland. His parents were Stanisław Simkha Gościnny, a chemical engineer from Warsaw, and Anna (Hanna) Bereśniak-Gościnna from Chodorków (Ходорків), a small village near Kyiv in Ukraine. Goscinny's maternal grandfather, Abraham Lazare Berezniak, founded a printing company. Claude, Goscinny's older brother, was six years older, born on 10 December 1920.

Stanisław and Anna had met in Paris and married in 1919. When René was two, the Gościnnys moved to Buenos Aires, Argentina, because his father had been hired as a chemical engineer there. René had a happy childhood in Buenos Aires and studied in French-language schools there. He was often the "class clown", probably to compensate for a natural shyness. He started drawing very early on, inspired by the illustrated stories which he enjoyed reading.

In December 1943, the year after Goscinny graduated from lycée or high school, his father died of a cerebral hemorrhage (stroke). The youth had to go to work. The next year, he got his first job, as an assistant accountant in a tire recovery factory. After being laid off the following years, Goscinny became a junior illustrator in an advertising agency.

Goscinny, along with his mother, emigrated from Argentina and immigrated to New York, United States in 1945, to join her brother Boris. To avoid service in the United States Armed Forces, he travelled to France to join the French Army in 1946. He served at Aubagne, in the 141st Alpine Infantry Battalion. Promoted to senior corporal, he became the appointed artist of the regiment and drew illustrations and posters for the army.

First works
The following year, Goscinny worked on an illustrated version of the Balzac short story "The Girl with the Golden Eyes." In April of that year he returned to New York.

There he went through the most difficult period of his life. For a while, Goscinny was jobless, alone, and living in poverty. By 1948, though, he had begun working in a small studio, where he became friends with future MAD Magazine contributors Will Elder, Jack Davis, and Harvey Kurtzman. Goscinny became art director at Kunen Publishers, where he wrote four books for children.

Around this time he met two Belgian comic artists, Joseph Gillain, better known as Jijé, and Maurice de Bevere, also known as Morris. Morris lived in the US for six years, having already started his cartoon series Lucky Luke. (He and Goscinny collaborated on this, with Goscinny writing it from 1955 until his death in 1977, a period described as its golden age).

Georges Troisfontaines, chief of the World Press agency, convinced Goscinny to return to France in 1951 in order to work for his agency as the head of the Paris office. There he met Albert Uderzo, with whom he started a longtime collaboration. They started out with some work for Bonnes Soirées, a women's magazine for which Goscinny wrote Sylvie. Goscinny and Uderzo also launched the series Jehan Pistolet and Luc Junior, in the magazine La Libre Junior.

In 1955, Goscinny, together with Uderzo, Jean-Michel Charlier, and Jean Hébrad, founded the syndicate Edipress/Edifrance. The syndicate launched publications such as Clairon for the factory union and Pistolin for a chocolate company. Goscinny and Uderzo cooperated on the series Bill Blanchart in Jeannot, Pistolet in Pistolin, and Benjamin et Benjamine in the magazine of the same name. Under the pseudonym Agostini, Goscinny wrote Le Petit Nicolas for Jean-Jacques Sempé in Le Moustique. It was later published in Sud-Ouest and Pilote magazines.

In 1956, Goscinny began a collaboration with Tintin magazine. He wrote some short stories for Jo Angenot and Albert Weinberg, and worked on Signor Spaghetti with Dino Attanasio, Monsieur Tric with Bob de Moor, Prudence Petitpas with Maurice Maréchal, Globul le Martien and Alphonse with Tibet, Strapontin with Berck and Modeste et Pompon with André Franquin. An early creation with Uderzo, Oumpah-pah, was also adapted for serial publication in Tintin from 1958 to 1962. In addition, Goscinny appeared in the magazines Paris-Flirt (Lili Manequin with Will) and Vaillant (Boniface et Anatole with Jordom, Pipsi with Godard).

Pilote and Astérix (1959)
In 1959, the Édifrance/Édipresse syndicate started the Franco-Belgian comics magazine Pilote. Goscinny became one of the most productive writers for the magazine. In the magazine's first issue, he launched Astérix, with Uderzo. The series was an instant hit and remains popular worldwide. Goscinny also restarted the series Le Petit Nicolas and Jehan Pistolet, now called Jehan Soupolet. Goscinny also began Jacquot le Mousse and Tromblon et Bottaclou with Godard.

The magazine was bought by Georges Dargaud in 1960, and Goscinny became editor-in-chief. He also began new series like Les Divagations de Monsieur Sait-Tout (with Martial), La Potachologie Illustrée (with Cabu), Les Dingodossiers (with Gotlib) and La Forêt de Chênebeau (with Mic Delinx). With Tabary, he launched Calife Haroun El Poussah in Record, a series that was later continued in Pilote as Iznogoud. With Raymond Macherot he created Pantoufle for Spirou.

Family
Goscinny married Gilberte Pollaro-Millo in 1967. In 1968 their daughter Anne Goscinny was born. She also became an author.

Anne Goscinny, the daughter of René Goscinny, co-wrote the screenplay for Little Nicholas: Happy As Can Be, 2022 animation film with Michel Fessler and Massoubre.

Death

Goscinny died at 51, in Paris of cardiac arrest on 5 November 1977, during a routine stress test at his doctor's office. He was buried in the Jewish Cemetery in Nice. In accordance with his will, most of his money was transferred to the chief rabbinate of France.

Goscinny's death occurred halfway through the writing of Asterix in Belgium (published in 1979, two years after his death). As a homage to Goscinny, Uderzo drew darkened skies and rain into the comic for the rest of the book, to mark the point at which Goscinny died. There is a further tribute at the end of Asterix in Belgium; near the lower left corner of the final panel of the album, Uderzo drew a rabbit sadly looking over its shoulders towards Goscinny's signature.

After Goscinny's death, Uderzo began to write Asterix himself and continued the series, although at a much slower pace, until passing the series over in 2011 to writer Jean-Yves Ferri and illustrator Didier Conrad. Tabary similarly began to write Iznogoud himself, whereas Morris continued Lucky Luke with various other writers.

In a tribute to Goscinny, Uderzo gave his late colleague's likeness to the Jewish character Saul ben Ephishul in the 1981 album L'Odyssée d'Astérix ("Asterix and the Black Gold"), which is dedicated to Goscinny's memory.

Awards and honors
1974: Adamson Award for best international comic strip artist, Sweden
2005: Inducted in the Will Eisner Hall of Fame as a Judges' choice, U.S.

Since 1996, the René Goscinny Award is presented at the yearly Angoulême International Comics Festival in France as an encouragement for young comic writers.

According to UNESCO's Index Translationum, Goscinny, as of August 2017, was the 20th most-translated author, with 2,200 translations of his work.

On 23 January 2020, a life-sized bronze statue of Goscinny was unveiled near his former home in Paris. It was the first public statue in Paris dedicated to a comic book author.

Filmography

Bibliography

a.    As part of a writers' team coming up with gags.
b.   The series Lucky Luke, Modeste et Pompon, Asterix and Iznogoud were continued by other writers after Goscinny's death.

Notes

References

 Goscinny publications in Pilote, Spirou, French Tintin and Belgian Tintin BDoubliées 
 Goscinny albums Bedetheque

External links

 Goscinny official site 
 Astérix official site
 On Dupuis.com
 Goscinny biography on Asterix International!
 Goscinny biography on Lambiek Comiclopedia
 Daughter Ann lighting Hanuka candles with family.
 

1926 births
1977 deaths
20th-century French illustrators
20th-century French military personnel
20th-century French writers
Asterix
Comic book editors
French Army soldiers
French cartoonists
French children's writers
French comics writers
French editors
French magazine editors
French expatriates in Argentina
French expatriates in the United States
French male writers
French people of Polish-Jewish descent
French satirists
Jewish artists
Jewish French writers
Lucky Luke
Will Eisner Award Hall of Fame inductees
Writers from Paris
César Honorary Award recipients